The British Journal of Nutrition is a peer-reviewed scientific journal covering research on animal and human nutrition. It was established in 1947 and is published by Cambridge University Press on behalf of The Nutrition Society. The editor-in-chief is Professor John Mathers of Newcastle University. According to the Journal Citation Reports, the journal has a 2019 impact factor of 3.334.

References

External links 
 
 The Nutrition Society

English-language journals
Cambridge University Press academic journals
Nutrition and dietetics journals
Biweekly journals
Publications established in 1947
Academic journals associated with learned and professional societies of the United Kingdom